Afroneta longipalpis is a species of sheet weaver found in Reunion. It was described by Ledoux & Attié in 2008.

References

Linyphiidae
Spiders described in 2008
Spiders of Réunion